Marguerite Marie Alibert (9 December 1890 – 2 January 1971), also known as Maggie Meller, Marguerite Laurent, and Princess Fahmy, was a French socialite. She started her career as a prostitute and later courtesan in Paris, and from 1917 to 1918, she had an affair with the Prince of Wales (later Edward VIII). After her marriage to Egyptian aristocrat Ali Kamel Fahmy Bey, she was frequently called Princess by the media of the time. In 1923, she killed her husband at the Savoy Hotel in London. She was eventually acquitted of the murder charge after a trial at the Old Bailey.

Life
Marguerite Marie Alibert was born on 9 December 1890, in Paris to Firmin Alibert, a coachman, and Marie Aurand, a housekeeper. At sixteen, she gave birth to a daughter, Raymonde. In the following eight to ten years, Alibert led a nomadic life until she met Mme Denant, who ran a Maison de Rendezvous, a brothel catering to a high society clientele. Under the tutelage of Denant, Alibert became a high-class prostitute.

Relationships

Edward, Prince of Wales
Alibert met Edward, Prince of Wales, in April 1917 at the Hôtel de Crillon in Paris. At the time, Edward was in France as an officer of the Grenadier Guards in the Western Front during World War I. Edward became infatuated with her and during their relationship he wrote many candid letters to her. Although the affair was intense while it lasted, by the end of the war, Edward had broken off the relationship.

Ali Fahmy
Ali Fahmy Bey became infatuated with Alibert when he first encountered her in Egypt while she was escorting a  businessman. He saw her again several times in Paris, and they were eventually formally introduced in July 1922. Following that meeting, they embarked on a tour of gambling and entertainment establishments in Deauville, Biarritz, and Paris. Fahmy returned to Egypt, but soon after, he invited her to the country, feigning illness and telling her that he could not live without her. They were married in December 1922 and had a formal Islamic wedding in January 1923.

Killing of Ali Fahmy
On 1 July, the couple arrived in London for the holidays. They stayed at the Savoy Hotel with their entourage consisting of a secretary, a valet, and a maid. On 9 July, the couple and the secretary went to see the operetta The Merry Widow. Upon returning to the hotel, they had a late supper where they started one of their frequent arguments. At 2:30 a.m. on 10 July 1923, Alibert shot her husband repeatedly from behind, striking him in the neck, back, and head. She used a .32 calibre semi-automatic Browning pistol. The victim was transported to Charing Cross Hospital but died of his wounds in about an hour.

Trial
The trial opened on Monday, 10 September 1923, with many people queuing to enter, including some who had waited since before daybreak. The trial lasted until Saturday, 15 September. During the trial, Alibert presented herself as the victim of the "brutality and beastliness" of her "oriental husband". Alibert was defended by Edward Marshall Hall, one of the most famous British lawyers of that era. The trial judge disallowed any mention of Alibert's past as a courtesan, ensuring that the name of the Prince of Wales was never mentioned as part of the evidence during the trial. At the same time, Fahmy was described as "a monster of Eastern depravity and decadence, whose sexual tastes were indicative of an amoral sadism towards his helpless European wife". Alibert was acquitted of all charges.

Post trial
After the trial, Alibert sued her late husband's family aiming to lay claim to his property. A court in Egypt rejected the verdict at the Old Bailey and dismissed her claim. She lived in an apartment facing the Ritz in Paris until the end of her life. After her death, the few remaining letters from Edward (if these existed), which she had kept as insurance, 
were found and destroyed.

In culture

Books
In the 2013 book The Prince, the Princess and the Perfect Murder, it is speculated that the acquittal of Alibert of the charges of murdering her husband was part of a deal for returning the love letters of the Prince of Wales to him and a further guarantee by Alibert that Edward's name would not be mentioned in court.

The killing of her husband was also the focus of the 1991 book Scandal at the Savoy: The Infamous 1920s Murder Case.

Television
In 2013, the UK Channel 4 aired the documentary Edward VIII's Murderous Mistress: Was there a cover-up of Edward VIII's fling with a murderess?

References

1890 births
1971 deaths
19th-century French people
20th-century French criminals
19th-century French women
20th-century French women
1923 murders in Europe
Socialites from Paris
French courtesans
French female murderers
Mistresses of Edward VIII
Mariticides
People acquitted of murder
Criminals from Paris